AG Bell may refer to:

 Alexander Graham Bell, (1847  – 1922) the scientist, inventor, engineer and innovator credited with inventing the first practical telephone
 The Alexander Graham Bell Association for the Deaf and Hard of Hearing, in Washington, D.C.